Exile Amongst the Ruins is the ninth full-length album by Irish metal band Primordial. The album was released on March 30, 2018 through Metal Blade Records.

Track listing

Personnel
Primordial
 A.A. Nemtheanga – Vocals, lyrics
 Ciáran MacUiliam – Guitars
 Michael O'Floinn – Guitars
 Pól MacAmlaigh – Bass
 Simon O'Laoghaire – Drums

Production and art
 Ola Ersfjord – Producer, Engineer, Mixing
 Costin Chioreanu – Artwork, Layout
 Chris Common – Mastering
 Mihai Anghel – Photography
 Gareth Averill – Photography

Charts

References

2018 albums
Primordial (band) albums